Brandon Markosek is an American politician serving as a member of the Pennsylvania House of Representatives from the 25th district. Elected in November 2020, he assumed office on December 1, 2018, succeeding his father, Joseph Markosek.

Markosek earned a Bachelor of Science degree in political science and history from Duquesne University in 2015 and a Master of Public Administration from the University of Pittsburgh in 2017.

Committee assignments 

 Consumer Affairs
 Game & Fisheries
 Professional Licensure
 Veterans Affairs & Emergency Preparedness

References 

Living people
Democratic Party members of the Pennsylvania House of Representatives
Duquesne University alumni
University of Pittsburgh alumni
Year of birth missing (living people)